Gams may be:

Acronyms
 General Algebraic Modeling System (GAMS), a mathematical optimization computer program
 Guide to Available Mathematical Software (GAMS), a project of the National Institute of Standards and Technology
 Graduate of Ayurvedic Medicine and Surgery (GAMS), a degree in Ayurvedic Medicine and Surgery nowadays called BAMS (Bachelor's degree in Ayurvedic Medicine and surgery)

Places
 Gams, a municipality of Switzerland
 Bad Gams, a municipality of Austria
 Gams bei Hieflau, a municipality of Austria
 Gams, German name for Kamnica, Maribor, a village northwest of Maribor, Slovenia

People
 Helmut Gams, known by the author abbreviation "Gams"
 Pius Bonifacius Gams, ecclesiastical historian

Music
 "Gams", a song by the Cincinnati blues-rock group The Bronx Kill

Other
 plural of Gam (nautical term), a social meeting between ships at sea